Tamil–Kannada is an inner branch (Zvelebil 1990:56) of the Southern Dravidian I (SDr I) subfamily of the Dravidian languages that include Tamil, Kannada and Malayalam. (There have been slight differences in the way Dravidian languages are grouped by various Dravidian linguists: See Subrahmanyam 1983, Zvelebil 1990, Krishnamurthi 2003). Tamil–Kannada itself is designated as a branch of the South Dravidian subfamily and in turn branches off into Tamil–Malayalam and Kannada–Badaga. The languages that constitute the Tamil–Kannada branch are Tamil, Kannada, Malayalam, Irula, Toda, Kota, Kodava, and Badaga. (Zvelebil 1990:56)
  
According to R. C. Hiremath, the separation of Tamil and Kannada into independent languages from the Tamil–Kannada inner branch started with the separation of Tulu in about 1500 BCE and completed in about 300 BCE.

Kannada, Tamil and Malayalam are recognized among the official languages of India and are spoken mainly in South India. All three are officially recognized as classical languages by the Government of India, along with Sanskrit, Telugu, and Odia.

Phonological features
Tamil and Malayalam have both retroflex lateral (/ɭ/) and retroflex approximant (/ɻ/) sounds, whereas Kannada has retained only the retroflex lateral. Evidence shows that both retroflex approximant and the retroflex laterals were once (before the 10th century) also present in Kannada. However, all the retroflex approximants changed into retroflex laterals in Kannada later. In Kannada, the bilabial voiceless plosive (/p/) at the beginning of many words has disappeared to produce a velar fricative (/h/) or has disappeared completely. This change is unique to Kannada in the Dravidian family. Tamil does not show this change.

Tamil and Telugu show the conversion of Voiceless velar plosive (/k/) into Voiceless palatal plosive (/c/) at the beginning of the words (refer to comparative method for details). Kannada, however, is totally inert to this change and hence the velar plosives are retained as such or with minimum changes in the corresponding words.

References

Citations

Sources 

 Krishnamurti, B., The Dravidian Languages, Cambridge University Press, 2003. .
 Subrahmanyam, P.S.,  Dravidian Comparative Phonology, Annamalai University, 1983.
 Zvelebil, Kamil., ''Dravidian Linguistics: An Introduction", PILC (Pondicherry Institute of Linguistics and Culture), 1990.

Agglutinative languages
Dravidian languages
Languages of India